Eusebio Bardají y Azara (19 December 1776, in Graus, Spain – 7 March 1842, in Huete, Spain) was a Spanish politician and diplomat who served as the Prime Minister of Spain in 1837 and held other offices such as Minister of State.

External links

|-

|-

1776 births
1842 deaths
People from Ribagorza
Moderate Party (Spain) politicians
19th-century Spanish politicians
Prime Ministers of Spain
Foreign ministers of Spain